NSTAR may refer to:

NASA Solar Technology Application Readiness (NSTAR), a type of spacecraft ion thruster.
NSTAR (company), a Boston utility company for electricity and natural gas.